The New York Dramatic Mirror (1879–1922) was a prominent theatrical trade newspaper.

History

The paper was founded in January 1879 by Ernest Harvier as the New York Mirror.   In stating its purpose to cover the theater, it proclaimed that coverage of the dramatic profession had been "degraded by having its affairs treated in the professedly theatrical papers side by side with prize fights, cocking matches, baseball, and other sports."  This referred to competitors such as the New York Clipper.

The word "Dramatic" was inserted in the title in 1889, and the "New York" dropped in 1917.  Harrison Grey Fiske started contributing in 1879, and eventually obtained ownership of the paper.  Fiske's involvement ended in 1911.  Frederick Franklin Schrader and Lymon O. Fiske then took over.

The paper published until April 1922, after changing from a weekly publication to a monthly at its very end.

Contributors

Frank Luther Mott, a historian of American magazines, called the Mirror the "matchless chronicler of the New York stage," though it also included reports from other cities including London and Chicago.  Contributors over its history included William Winter ("Dramatic Diary" column), Nym Crinkle ("Feuilleton"), Frank E. Woods ("Spectator" column), Burns Mantle, Mary H. Fiske ("The Giddy Gusher"), and Charles Carroll.

See also
New York Clipper
Illustrated Sporting and Dramatic News
The Morning Telegraph
Variety

References

External links

Archives of paper at fultonhistory.com 
The New York Dramatic Mirror Vol. 62 (July–September 1909)
Dramatic Mirror Vol. 95 No. 2249 (April 1922)

Publications established in 1879
Publications disestablished in 1922
Defunct newspapers published in New York City
1879 establishments in New York (state)
1922 disestablishments in New York (state)